The Home International Regatta is a rowing regatta held every year for the countries of the British Isles - England, Ireland, Scotland, and Wales.  Events are held for both men and women at junior (under 18) and senior levels, including Para-rowing events.  The race has been held since 1962 and each country takes it in turns to host the event. Prior to moving to Cardiff Bay, Welsh Rowing hosted the event outside Wales on a number of occasions in both Strathclyde and Ghent.

History
At The News of the World sponsored regatta on the Serpentine Regatta in Hyde Park, a Home International or "Quadrangular" was held between 1962 and 1964. The sponsorship was dropped and the competition lapsed, but in 1966 however the competition was revived with a match in Monmouth in Wales. The following year the competition was expanded to include a junior men's match. Women's rowing followed in 1969 and finally a women's junior match in 1984.

In December 2019 a new format was introduced, to reduce the overall team size, improve competition for places, ensuring that the best rowers get the opportunity to represent their country, and helping to support a more aspirational performance pathway event. This requires all rowers will double up from small boats into either a coxless quad or eight. There are also additional sprint races over 500m in coxless quads and eights. 

In December 2021, with the growth of the Beach Sprint format internationally and the prospect of the format being introduced to the 2028 LA Olympics it was agreed amongst the Home Nations to introduce a new event the Home International Rowing Beach Sprints (HIRBS). The first event being held by Scotland at St Andrews.

Trophies
The trophies competed for are as follows (brackets designate the donating country):
 Men               : The Annamarie Phelps Trophy (England) [This replaced the retired News of the World Cup (England)]
 Women          : The Dame Katherine Grainger Quaich (Scotland) [This replaced the missing County of Renfrew Rosebowl (Scotland)]
 Junior Men      : The John Hartland Trophy (Wales) [This replaced the retired Duncan Trophy (Scotland)]
 Junior Women : The Irish Travel Agency Cup (Ireland)
 Volunteers :The Griffiths family Trophy (Wales)

Home Nation Racing colours
The racing colours of each country are as follows:

Home International Rowing Regatta Results

'** Hosted by Welsh Rowing.

'#  Hosted by English Rowing

The last 4 columns refer to the overall winner in each of the event categories: Senior Men (SM), Senior Women (SW), Junior Men (JM), and Junior Women (JW).

The match winners are found from calculating the total number of points won by each country in each section (e.g. Junior Women). Countries receive 4 points for 1st place, 3 points for 2nd place, 2 points for 3rd place and 1 point for 4th.

Home International Rowing Beach Sprints

See also
 British Rowing
 Rowing Ireland
 Scottish Rowing
 Welsh Rowing

References

External links
 

Rowing in Ireland
Rowing in Scotland
Rowing in England
Rowing in Wales
Rowing in the United Kingdom
Rowing competitions
Recurring sporting events established in 1962
1962 establishments in the United Kingdom